Inlet Centre is a below-grade station on the Millennium Line of Metro Vancouver's SkyTrain rapid transit system. It is located in Port Moody, British Columbia, Canada and opened for service on December 2, 2016, along with the rest of the Evergreen Extension.

Location
Inlet Centre is located underneath the Barnet Highway overpass for the Canadian Pacific Railway located at Ioco Road, with the guideway leading into the station running parallel to railway. The high-density neighbourhoods of NewPort Village and Suter Brook are located just north of the station.

Station information

Station layout

Entrances
 West entrance : is located on the west side of Barnet Highway. Bus bay 1 and 2 are located closest to this entrance.
 East entrance : is located on the east side of Barnet Highway. Bus bay 3 is located closest to this entrance.

Transit connections

Inlet Centre station provides connections to several Tri-Cities bus routes. Bus bay assignments are as follows:

References

External links
Inlet Centre Station

Buildings and structures in Port Moody
Evergreen Extension stations
Millennium Line stations
Railway stations in Canada opened in 2016
2016 establishments in British Columbia